God's House of Hip Hop radio also referred to as GH3 Radio powered by Dash Radio is a commercial Stellar Awards winning CHH, Latin Christian Hip Hop (LCHH) & Gospel Hip Hop digital radio station serving the Los Angeles area owned and operated by Emcee N.I.C.E. who also serves as the stations Curator and Business Entrepreneur Chantal Grayson who serves as the stations assistant program director.

The Station launched on August 20, 2018 with 6 shows and in one year became the first Christian faith based hip hop station to be honored Gospel Music's most prestigious award, The Stellar Award for "Best Gospel Hip Hop Radio Station” in 2019 and in the same year would also go on to win 5 "Spin Awards" honoring those that spin gospel music winning "Best New Station of The Year", "Internet Radio Station of the Year", "Best Radio Show (2 or more host)" Hosted by Emcee N.I.C.E. & The God Squad, "DJ of the Year" (DJ I Rock Jesus) & "Internet Radio Personality of the Year" (Emcee N.I.C.E.)

God's House of Hip Hop Radio also became the first faith based Hip Hop radio station to be Nielsen BDS/MRC Data & Digital Radio Tracker Monitored Radio.

History
On August 20, 2018 God's House of Hip Hop Radio made its debut on the Dash Radio platform with six shows, chartering new territory for an emerging genre in CHH, Latin Christian hip hop & gospel hip hop. from TV commercials, to gaming, to motion pictures, Christian hip hop is being sought after. As the market continued to expand more and more listeners were looking for alternate ways to hear Christian rap,  with Dash radio on the cutting edge of radio and technology, it became the landing spot for GH3 radio. Through Dash, God's House of Hip Hop radio is able to offers millions of listeners non-stop CHH and Gospel Hip-Hop music along with live broadcasts giving a platform to artists the like NF, KB, Lecrae, Bizzle, Emcee N.I.C.E., Andy Mineo, Derek Minor, Alex Zurdo, Manny Montes and a host of other recording artists.

GH3 Radio was the brainchild of Christian hip hop recording artist Aulsondro "Novelist" Hamilton also known as "Emcee N.I.C.E." and Business Entrepreneur Chantal Grayson also known as "Chanie G".

Music Programming
God's House of Hip Hop (GH3 Radio) has a playlist consisting of a balance of current Christian Hip Hop, Latin Christian Hip Hop, and Gospel Hip Hop songs during most parts of the day along with 18 radio shows that play from  Monday thru Sunday. The shows air at various times throughout the day covering an array of subjects and topics, from new music to countdowns to mixtapes to industry gossip, mix shows as well as sports, all playing nothing but faith based hip hop music.

God's House of Hip Hop Radio (GH3 Radio) is a monitored station and contributes to both BDS and Digital Radio Tracker information on its playlist.

Awards
In March 2019, God's House of Hip Hop Radio was named Gospel Hip Hop Station of the Year by the Stellar Awards
In October 2019, God's House of Hip Hop won 5 Gospel Spin Awards for Radio

2019
In 2019 God's House of Hip Hop Radio became the first Christian Hip Hop/Faith Based Radio Station in History to win a Stellar Award in its 34 year history and The Spin Awards, honoring those that spin Gospel in the same year. 
 

Received 12 NOMINATIONS, Other notable nominations include "Best Radio Show","Internet Radio Personality of the Year" & "Radio Station of the Year"

2020

Received 8 NOMINATIONS, Other notable nominations include "Best Morning Show","Best Radio Show (2 or more)", "Internet Radio Station of the Year"

2021

Concerts
 God's House of Hip Hop 20/20 Summer Fest

References

External links
Official website|God's House of Hip Hop – #1 Christian, Latin, and Gospel Hip Hop Station

Radio stations in Los Angeles
Gospel radio stations in the United States
Radio stations established in 2018
2018 establishments in California
Digital-only radio stations
Christian radio stations in California